Malay Kumar Lahiri (born 20 September 1934) is a former Indian association football player. He was part of the team that competed in the 1960 Summer Olympics. He played for Services in Santosh Trophy.

Honours

India
Merdeka Tournament runner-up: 1959

References

External links
 

1934 births
Living people
Indian footballers
India international footballers
Footballers at the 1960 Summer Olympics
Olympic footballers of India
Footballers from West Bengal
Association football forwards